Miriwoong Sign Language is a developed Australian Aboriginal sign language used by the Miriwoong, an Aboriginal community in the north of Australia. It is mostly used by the hearing community, but three deaf speakers have been identified. Speakers do not find Yolngu Sign Language to be understandable.

References

Further reading

Australian Aboriginal Sign Language family
Jarrakan languages